Paul McGrath may refer to:

 Paul McGrath (actor) (1904–1978), American actor
 Paul McGrath (conductor) (born 1964), British conductor
 Paul McGrath (footballer) (born 1959), Irish international footballer
 Paul McGrath (politician) (born 1948), Irish politician and Fine Gael Teachta Dála (TD) for Westmeath
 Paul McGrath (Gaelic footballer) (born 1966), Irish Gaelic footballer
 J. Paul McGrath, American attorney